Hatch Valley Public Schools is a school district headquartered in Hatch, New Mexico.

In addition to Hatch, the district's area includes Garfield, Placitas, Rincon, Rodey, and Salem.

History
In February 2021, during the COVID-19 pandemic in New Mexico, the district decided that, as its students needed to compete in the New Mexico Activities Association, it would need to enact hybrid learning.

Circa 2022 the W.K. Kellogg Foundation donated $300,000, which the district planned to use to increase its agriculture-based programs.

Schools
 Secondary
 Hatch Valley High School
 Hatch Valley Middle School

 Elementary
 Garfield Elementary School
 Hatch Valley Elementary School
 Rio Grande Elementary School

References

Further reading
  - SEDL is now a part of the American Institutes for Research

External links
 Hatch Valley Public Schools
School districts in New Mexico
Education in Doña Ana County, New Mexico